The Menshevik Trial was one of the early purges carried out by Stalin in which 14 economists, who were former members of the Menshevik party, were put on trial and convicted for trying to re-establish their party as the "Union Bureau of the Mensheviks". It was held 1–8 March 1931 in the House of Unions. The presiding judge was Nikolay Shvernik.

Defendants
The defendants were:

 Boris Berlatsky
 Aleksandr Finn-Enotaevsky
 Abram Ginzburg
 Vladimir Groman
 Mikhail Yakubovich
 Vladimir Ikov
 Kirill Petunin
 Isaak Illich Rubin
 Vasili Sher
 Aron Sokolovsky
 Nikolai Sukhanov
 Moisei Teitelbaum
 Ivan Volkov
 Lazar Zalkind

Six out of the fourteen defendants were Jews. It was suggested in Bundist circles that this large proportion of Jews among the accused had been specially arranged to organize feeling against the Jewish Socialists. This was denied by Stalin.

The trial
The defendants were accused of setting up the "All-Union Bureau of Mensheviks." Vladimir Groman gave a public testimony that he and Vladimir Bazarov (who was not on trial) headed a counterrevolutionary group in Gosplan, purportedly organized in 1923, which attempted at "influencing the economic policy of the Soviet authorities so as to hold the position of 1923–25." Groman, being a member of the Presidium of the Gosplan the star figure among the accused, damned himself and his colleagues with testimony that at Gosplan they had spent their time

Putting into the control figures and into the surveys of current business planning ideas and deliberately distorted appraisals antagonistic to the general Party line (lowering the rates of expansion of socialist construction, distorting the class approach, exaggerating the difficulties), stressing the signs of an impending catastrophe (Groman) or, what is close to this, assigning a negligible chance of success to the Party line directed toward the socialist attack (Bazarov, Gukhman) ...

Final day
On the final day, the prisoners made confessions of their "crimes". "In the last minutes before my death", one of them was quoted saying, "I will think with disgust of the evil I have wrought; evil for which not we, but foreign Menshevists and the Second International must share responsibility."

Nikolai Krylenko, the Public Prosecutor, declared that Groman, Sher, Yakubovitch, Ginzburg, and Sukhanov were the principal leaders of the counter-revolutionary organization, and therefore, must suffer the death penalty. For the others he asked that they should be isolated "for long periods".

Verdict
At 9 March 1931, after deliberating for twenty-five hours, the court sentenced seven defendants to ten years' imprisonment. The seven other defendants were sentenced to different terms of imprisonment, ranging from five to eight years. Those who received the ten years' sentence were Groman, Sher, Sukhanov, Ginzburg, Jakobovich, Petunina, and Finn-Enotaevsky.

Reactions
Rafail Abramovich, a prominent Menshevik in exile in Berlin, helped to mobilise Western socialist and labour support for the persecuted economists. At a rally in Berlin, organised by the SPD, he denied there was an underground Menshevik organisation that existed in the Soviet Union. Leon Trotsky also commented on the trial, condemning both Stalin and the Mensheviks.

See also
 Case of the Union of Liberation of Belarus

Footnotes

Further reading

 A.L. Litvin (ed.), Men'shevistskii Protsess 1931 goda: Sbornik dokumentov v 2-x knigakh (The Menshevik Trial of 1931: Collection of documents in 2 volumes). Moscow: ROSSPEN, 1999.
 Protsess kontrrrevoliutsionnoi organizatsii Men'shevikov (1 Marta-9 Marta 1933 g.): Stenogramma sudebnoe protsess ... (Trial of the Counterrevolutionary Organization of Mensheviks, 1–9 March 1931: Stenogram of the Legal Trial ...). Moscow: Sovetskoe Zakonodatel'stvo, 1931.

Soviet show trials
1931 in the Soviet Union
Events in Moscow
Political and cultural purges
Jews and Judaism in the Soviet Union
Antisemitism in Russia